The Tankersley-Stewart House was a historic house in rural Johnson County, Arkansas.  Located north of Arkansas Highway 352, between Hunt and Clarksville, it was a single-story vernacular wood-frame structure and a gabled roof.  A single-story porch extended across its front, supported by square posts.  Its only significant styling was an interior fireplace mantel with Greek Revival features.  It was built about 1895 by Dr. Oliver Tankersley.

The house was listed on the National Register of Historic Places in 1994. It has been listed as demolished in the Arkansas Historic Preservation Program database.

See also
National Register of Historic Places listings in Johnson County, Arkansas

References

Houses on the National Register of Historic Places in Arkansas
National Register of Historic Places in Johnson County, Arkansas
Greek Revival architecture in Arkansas
Houses completed in 1895
Houses in Johnson County, Arkansas